Sabine Ginther (born 3 February 1970) is a retired Austrian alpine skier.

Career
In her short career in the World Cup, which lasted just 5 seasons, she achieved 14 podiums (6 wins). She has also won a Europa Cup and 8 medals (6 gold) at the Junior World Championships.

Europa Cup results
She has won an overall Europa Cup and one specialty standings.

FIS Alpine Ski Europa Cup
Overall: 1989
Downhill: 1989

References

External links
 

1970 births
Living people
Austrian female alpine skiers
FIS Alpine Ski World Cup champions
Place of birth missing (living people)
20th-century Austrian women
21st-century Austrian women